Topi Mattila (born 29 March 1946 in Helsinki) is a Finnish former ski jumper who competed from 1964 to 1969. He finished fifth in the individual normal hill event at the 1968 Winter Olympics in Grenoble, which was Mattila's best career finish as well.

External links

Topi Mattila's profile at Sports Reference.com

1946 births
Living people
Sportspeople from Helsinki
Ski jumpers at the 1968 Winter Olympics
Finnish male ski jumpers
Olympic ski jumpers of Finland
20th-century Finnish people